The higher education controversy in Odisha is a sensitive political issue that has caused parliamentary walkouts, violence, and unrest, and has been the subject of scholarly publications regarding the Indian state of Odisha. According to media reports, there has been large-scale discrimination in setting up these institutions of higher learning against a few states, especially Odisha.

It has also been observed within scholarly circles that Odisha (known before 2011 as Orissa) is routinely discriminated against by the Indian government, which has caused the state to lag behind the rest of the nation in terms of infrastructure, poverty reduction, literacy, education, and health.

Origin

In the 11th five-year plan, the Ministry of Human Resources Development (HRD), Manmohan Singh's government had proposed to set up several premier technical institutes across the country to produce a world-class talent pool in science, engineering, and management, which would contribute significantly towards the economic development of the states where they are located, as well as the nation. The then HRD Minister, Arjun Singh, proposed setting up three new IITs, three IISERs, five new IIMs, twenty new IIITs and four new SPAs, which would receive direct funding from the central government instead of relying on smaller budgets through their state and local governments.
Media reports reveal that the distribution of these institutions across the states is highly oblique and largely dependent on the political influence of the state in question.

The following table shows the distributions of centrally funded institutions across India :

Alleged discrimination in existing institutions
None of the premier institutions of national importance are located in the eastern state of Odisha. In terms of per capita funding received from the HRD ministry, it is among the bottom-most of all states. The only states below it are Bihar, Rajasthan, and a few very small states in the northeastern region. There have been estimates of the amount of HRD funding received by each state within the Indian union. One recently published estimate is provided in the table below.

*in crore (=10,000,000) rupees

The non-allocation of quality educational institutions to the state of Odisha by New Delhi has been interpreted by various quarters, ranging from politicians to Oriya academics living abroad, as proof of discrimination against the state by the HRD ministry. Odisha, which has 3.6% of the population of India, receives a minuscule 0.73% of the allocated budget. This, it is claimed falls within the purview of a larger pattern of what the national media has labelled as the "step-motherly treatment" meted out to Odisha by the government of India.

Alleged discrimination in establishing new institutions
India's recent rapid economic expansion has created the need for more world-class talent. The Human Resources and Development ministry has undertaken the need to set up several more institutions of international quality. A total of twenty-three institutions were announced, including more IITs, IIMs, Central Universities, as well as the new Indian Institutes of Science Education & Research (IISERs) and the Indian Institutes of Engineering Science & Technology (IIESTs), all under the 11th Five Year Plan. As before, the state of Odisha has not been allocated any institution of national importance and continues to be the last state in terms of per capita investment in human resources by the Indian government. The regional disparities in this regard have been pointed out even by C. N. R. Rao, the scientific advisor to the Prime Minister of India.

Establishing an IIT in Odisha
The HRD ministry has recently announced plans to build three additional IITs in the states of Rajasthan, Bihar, and Andhra Pradesh. According to recent reports, the allocation of the new IITs to Rajasthan and Bihar is to compensate them for earlier neglect. Andhra Pradesh, which borders Odisha, will get the third IIT, allegedly shifted from Odisha. If the Indian media is to be believed, the UPA government has categorically declined to establish an IIT in Orissa.

Upgrading existing institute within Odisha to an IIEST
The IIESTs are a group of technical institutions that are planned to be established as IIT clones.  They will be set up by upgrading existing NITs and other state funded prominent engineering institutions.  Several institutions have been identified by the Indian government for this purpose.
Odisha has numerous government educational institutes, among which VSSUT is the oldest. Although a front runner for being IIEST in Odisha, but was allegedly sidelined when identifying potential IIESTs.

Shifting of planned IISER from Odisha
It has been alleged that the government had originally picked Bhubaneswar, the capital city of Odisha, as one of the locations for an IISER, which was later shifted to Kolkata. This issue was resolved when it was decided to set up a similar institution, the National Institute for Science Education and Research (NISER), which would be funded through a separate ministry. NISER is the only such upcoming institution in Odisha, whereas other states have had similar non-HRD funded institutions for several decades.

Establishing a Central University in Odisha's KBK region
The Koraput-Balangir-Kalahandi (KBK) region of Odisha is one of the most backward regions of India, with famines and large-scale starvation deaths reported each year. The region lacks infrastructure and the Indian government has done very little to alleviate the plight of the impoverished masses in those districts. There is a long-standing demand by the people of Odisha for the Indian government to establish a central university in this region, as part of the plan to ameliorate the poverty through various direct and indirect means such as education, as is being done in the underdeveloped north-east region.

Establishing an IIM in Odisha
The government of India declared an intention to establish five new IIMs in the country in the 2014-15 Budget speech of the Finance Minister. Odisha State has been granted one IIM institute which the State Government is planning to establish in the second largest knowledge hub of Odisha, Sambalpur having three renowned universities. It is the center of western Odisha with good communication facilities like Jharsuguda and Sambalpur railway junction and an ongoing airport project in Jharsuguda at 50 km distance.

Politics related to the issue

Hot parliamentary issue
Politicians including the chief minister of Odisha, Mr. Naveen Patnaik, have sought to cast this festering issue as a sign of severe neglect of the state by the government in New Delhi led by the United Progressive Alliance (UPA). In May 2007, the issue became a major issue in the Indian parliament. In his words, "Orissa does not have a single institution of national excellence and the demand for IIT is a long-standing one". The opposition National Democratic Alliance (NDA) staged a walk-out in the Indian parliament, accusing the ruling UPA of neglecting the state's economic development.

It was reported by sections of the media in May 2007 that the Congress party-led UPA government was embarrassed by this issue.
The HRD minister, Mr. Arjun Singh has also relented.

Street protests against alleged discrimination
There have been several incidents of protest in Odisha in 2007. Students have taken to the streets to demand the setting up of an IIT and other educational institutions in Odisha. Agamee Orissa, an organisation spearheading a mass agitation in Odisha has organised statewide rallies. There also have been stray incidents of violence related to the issue of Odisha's neglect. In May 2007, this issue was taken up by the National Students Union of India (NSUI).

References

External links
 Center for Promoting an Equitable India
 Orissa at the receiving end of MHRD again: Announced for new IIT for Orissa shifted?
 Orissa Watch
 Orissa News Updates

Universities and colleges in Odisha
Controversies in India